Edith Olivia "Edie" Thys (born March 31, 1966, in San Leandro, California) is an American former World Cup alpine ski racer who competed in two Winter Olympics (1988, 1992).

World Cup results

Season standings

Top ten finishes
 1 podium – (1 SG), 5 top tens

World Championship results

Olympic results

References

External links
 
 Edith Thys World Cup standings at the International Ski Federation
 
 
 
 
  – Racer eX

1966 births
Living people
American female alpine skiers
Olympic alpine skiers of the United States
Alpine skiers at the 1988 Winter Olympics
Alpine skiers at the 1992 Winter Olympics
21st-century American women